Kleinbettingen is a small town in the commune of Steinfort, in western Luxembourg.  As of 2005, the town has a population of 855.

Steinfort
Towns in Luxembourg